Abronia martindelcampoi, Martín del Campo's arboreal alligator lizard,  is an endangered species of arboreal alligator lizard described in 2003 by Flores-Villela and Sánchez-Herrera.

Etymology
The specific name, martindelcampoi, is in honor of Mexican herpetologist Rafael Martín del Campo.

Geographic range
A. martindelcampoi has been found only in the Mexican state of Guerrero.

Reproduction
A. martindelcampoi is viviparous.

References

Further reading
Flores-Villela O, Sánchez-H[errera] O (2003). "A New Species of Abronia (Squamata: Anguidae) from the Sierra Madre del Sur of Guerrero, Mexico, with Comments on Abronia deppii ". Herpetologica 59 (4): 524–531. (Abronia martindelcampoi, new species).

Abronia
Reptiles described in 2003
Endemic reptiles of Mexico